Ângelo Gaspar Martins (19 April 1930 – 11 October 2020), simply known as Ângelo, was a Portuguese footballer who played as a defender for Benfica and the Portugal national team.

Club career
Born in Porto on 19 April 1930, Ângelo turned down an opportunity to play football for FC Porto because he was a supporter of rivals Benfica, from Lisbon, and hometown club Salgueiros.

In 1945, aged 15, Ângelo started his career playing as a left defender for Académico do Porto, where he spent three years until he was scammed by an FC Porto staff member, who gave him a false document and made him sign for the club while he still was an Académico do Porto player. As a result, the Portuguese Football Federation (FPF) banned Ângelo from football, although the punishment would only last for a few months.

Three years later, when Ângelo was a worker at his father's shoe store and was serving in the military in Santarém at age 20, a Benfica scout watched him play and brought him to Lisbon in 1951 to represent Benfica's reserves, with the FPF backing down on his ban. During his 13 seasons with The Eagles main team, from 1952 to 1965, he made 285 appearances and scored 4 goals, winning 7 Primeira Liga titles, 5 Taça de Portugal, 1 Taça de Honra, and 2 consecutive European Cups (in 1961 and 1962). He retired as a player at age 35.

International career
Ângelo played for Portugal on 20 occasions. He made his debut in 1953 against Austria at the Prater Stadium and played his final match for the country in 1962 against Bulgaria at the Estádio do Restelo.

Death
Ângelo died of natural causes at 90 years old, on 11 October 2020, in the company of his family.

Honours
PlayerBenficaPrimeira Liga: 1954–55, 1956–57, 1959–60, 1960–61, 1962–63, 1963–64, 1964–65
Taça de Portugal: 1952–53, 1954–55, 1956–57, 1961–62, 1963–64
Taça de Honra: 1962–63
European Cup: 1960–61, 1961–62
Intercontinental Cup runner-up: 1961, 1962

ManagerBenfica'
 Campeonato Nacional de Juniores (7)
 Campeonato Nacional de Juvenis (6)
 Campeonato Nacional de Iniciados (2)

See also
List of one-club men

References

External links
 
 
 

1930 births
2020 deaths
Footballers from Porto
Association football defenders
Portuguese footballers
Portugal international footballers
S.L. Benfica footballers
UEFA Champions League winning players